Stobie may refer to:
 Stobie pole, a kind of power pole common in South Australia
 Adam Stobie, Scottish prisoner in the 17th century
 James Stobie, 18th century factor to John Murray, 4th Duke of Atholl
 William Stobie (1950–2001), Ulster Defence Association (UDA) quartermaster and RUC Special Branch informer